"" (In peace and joy I now depart) is a hymn by Martin Luther, a paraphrase in German of the , the canticle of Simeon. Luther wrote the text and melody, Zahn No. 3986, in 1524 and it was first published in the same year. Originally a song for Purification, it has been used for funerals.

The hymn appears in several translations, for example Catherine Winkworth's "In peace and joy I now depart", in nine hymnals. It has been used as the base for music, especially for vocal music such as Dieterich Buxtehude's funeral music  and Johann Sebastian Bach's chorale cantata .

History 
The text and melody were composed by Luther in the spring of 1524. Later in the same year, it was published in Wittenberg in Johann Walter's  (Wittenberg hymnal), but was not included in the Erfurt Enchiridion. Originally a song for Purification, it has been used for funerals.

Luther, a former monk, was familiar with the Latin  from the daily night prayer (compline). The hymn was dedicated to the celebration of the Purification on 2 February, which was kept by the Lutherans as a feast day. It became also one of the most important songs for the dying and for funerals. It is listed among those in the Protestant hymnal  as No. 519.

Text 

Luther expanded the thoughts of each of the four verses to a stanza of six lines. The first stanza expresses accepting death in peace, the second gives as a reason the meeting with the Saviour, the third accents his coming for all people, the fourth the coming as a light for the heathen and glory for Israel.() The lines are of different length, meter 8.4.8.4.7.7, stressing single statements. The hymn appears in several translations. The one used here is Catherine Winkworth's "In peace and joy I now depart", found in 9 hymnals, for example as No. 48 in the Evangelical Lutheran Hymnary.

Music 

The cantus firmus in the dorian mode, Zahn 3986, follows the text of the first stanza. The melody, which could predate Luther, contains figura corta motifs, in this case two quavers followed by a crotchet, an anapaest; for dactyls, with a long beat followed by two beats, these were motifs denoting "joy", in the classification of chorales introduced by Albert Schweitzer. In the fourth line, the melody has a descending scale for the text "" (soft and still). There have been several settings of the hymn for organ. In 1674 Dieterich Buxtehude composed a setting of the hymn as an elegy on the death of his father: the chorale prelude BuxWV 76 for two manuals and pedal. In the 1710s, Johann Sebastian Bach composed an organ chorale prelude BWV 616 as part of the Orgelbüchlein. Twentieth-century organ settings include Max Reger's Choral Preludes Nos. 5 and 10, Op. 79b (1901–03), and Ernst Pepping's Partita No. 3 (1953).

Several composers have written vocal settings, some intended for funerals. Four-part choral settings have been composed by Johann Walter (1524), Lupus Hellinck, published in 1544, Bartholomäus Gesius (1601), Michael Praetorius, Johann Hermann Schein, Samuel Scheidt and others. Heinrich Schütz used it in movement 21 of his , composed for the funeral of Henry II, Count of Reuss-Gera. Bach used the hymn as the base for his chorale cantata . Georg Philipp Telemann composed around 1729 a first sacred cantata for voices, strings and basso continuo, and a second cantata for voice, violin and continuo which is lost. Johannes Brahms used the first stanza to conclude his motet Warum ist das Licht gegeben dem Mühseligen?

References

Further reading 

 Wilhelm Lucke: Mit Fried und Freud ich fahr dahin. In: D. Martin Luthers Werke. Kritische Gesamtausgabe, vol. 35, Weimar 1923

External links 

 Andreas Wittenberg: Kirchenlieder aus dem Reformationsjahrhundert: Martin Luthers “Mit Fried und Freud ich fahr dahin” Deutsche Lieder. Bamberger Anthologie, 16 December 2013 
 BWV 125.6 bach-chorales.com

16th-century hymns in German
Hymn tunes
Hymns by Martin Luther